The 41st Deauville American Film Festival took place at Deauville, France from September 4 to 13, 2015. Baltasar Kormákur's biographical disaster film Everest served as the opening night film. Sicario by Denis Villeneuve was the closing night film of the festival. The Grand Prix was awarded to 99 Homes by Ramin Bahrani.

Complete lineup for the festival was announced on August 24, 2015. Total of 36 feature films were screened at the festival, 14 of which were in competition. In Television section, three episodes of Michael Connelly and Eric Overmyer's crime TV-series Bosch were screened. The festival paid tribute to  Orson Welles, Terrence Malick, Ian McKellen, Patricia Clarkson, Keanu Reeves, Michael Bay, Lawrence Bender and Orlando Bloom and hosted retrospective of their films. Robert Pattinson and Elizabeth Olsen received  Le Nouvel Hollywood (Hollywood Rising Star) awards.

Juries

Main Competition
Benoît Jacquot: French film director and screenwriter (President of Jury) 
Pascal Bonitzer: French film critic, screenwriter and director  
Louise Bourgoin: French actress  
Louis-Do De Lencquesaing: French actor and director  
Marc Dugain: French novelist  
Sophie Fillières: French screenwriter and director  
Marie Gillain: Belgian actress  
Julien Hirsch: French cinematographer  
Marthe Keller: Swiss actress and opera director

Cartier revelation jury
Zabou Breitman: French actress and director (President of Jury)  
Alice Isaaz: French actress  
Rachelle Lefevre: Canadian actress  
Géraldine Nakache: French actress, screenwriter and director 
Stanley Weber: French actor and theatre director

Programme

Competition
99 Homes by Ramin Bahrani
Songs My Brothers Taught Me by Chloé Zhao
Cop Car by Jon Watts
Dope by Rick Famuyiwa
Tangerine by Sean Baker
Day Out of Days by Zoe Cassavetes
Babysitter by Morgan Krantz
Dixieland by Hank Bedford
Emelie by Michael Thelin
James White by Josh Mond
Madame Bovary by Sophie Barthes
Krisha by Trey Edward Schultz
Green Room by Jeremy Saulnier
The Diary of a Teenage Girl by Marielle Heller

Les Premières (Premieres)
Everest by Baltasar Kormakur
The Man From U.N.C.L.E. by Guy Ritchie
Trainwreck by Judd Apatow
Danny Collins by Dan Fogelman
Experimenter by Michael Almereyda
Sleeping with Other People by Leslye Headland
Knight of Cups by Terrence Malick
Knock, Knock by Eli Roth
Pawn Sacrifice by Ed Zwick
The Prophet by Roger Allers
Life by Anton Corbijn
Mr. Holmes by Bill Condon
October Gale by Ruba Nadda
Ruth and Alex by Richard Loncraine
The Green Inferno by Eli Roth
Sicario by Denis Villeneuve

Les Docs De L'Oncle Sam (Uncle Sam's Doc)
Altman by Ron Mann
Hitchcock/Truffaut by Kent Jones
Janis by Penny Lane
Steve McQueen: The Man & Le Mans by Gabriel Clarke and John McKenna
This is Orson Welles by Clara Kuperberg and Julia Kuperberg
The Wolfpack by Crystal Moselle

Television
Bosch by Michael Connelly and Eric Overmyer

Awards

The festival awarded the following awards:
Grand Prix (Grand Special Prize): 99 Homes by Ramin Bahrani
Prix du Jury (Jury Special Prize): Tangerine by Sean Baker
Prix du Public (Audience Award): Dope by Rick Famuyiwa
Prix de la Critique Internationale (International Critics' prize): Krisha by Trey Edward Schultz
Prix Michel d'Ornano (Michel d'Ornano Award for debut French film): The Cowboys by Thomas Bidegain
Prix de la Révélation Cartier (Cartier Revelation Prize): James White by Josh Mond
Lucien Barrière Prize for Literature:
All Our Names by Dinaw Mengestu
Tributes:
Orson Welles
Terrence Malick
Ian McKellen
Patricia Clarkson
Keanu Reeves
Michael Bay
Lawrence Bender
Orlando Bloom
Le Nouvel Hollywood (Hollywood Rising Star):
Robert Pattinson 
Elizabeth Olsen

References

External links
 Official site
 2015 Official Press Kit 
 Deauville American Film Festival:2015 at Internet Movie Database

2015 in French cinema
2015 film festivals
2015 festivals in Europe
21st century in France
Film festivals in France